Benidorm Island is a small island and nature reserve of Spain, off the Spanish Mediterranean coast. Tourists can take boat trips from the mainland to the island to visit its wildlife.

Benidorm Island no longer houses any peacocks, but boat trips still run most days of the week. There are many fables regarding the island itself and how it got there including how a giant kicked a rock out of the mountain in anger which then landed in the sea.

References

Islands of Spain
Natural parks of Spain
Natural parks of the Valencian Community
Geography of the Province of Alicante
Protected areas of the Valencian Community
Landforms of the Valencian Community
Benidorm